Ann Jago (born 20 February 1939) is an English former cricketer who played primarily as a bowler. She appeared in two Test matches for England in 1960 and 1961, both against South Africa. She played domestic cricket for Kent.

Jago was educated at Wolverhampton Girls' High School, where she played in the cricket team alongside Rachael Heyhoe Flint and Jacqueline Elledge.

References

External links
 
 

1939 births
Living people
Cricketers from Kingston upon Hull
People educated at Wolverhampton Girls' High School
England women Test cricketers
Kent women cricketers